Esophoria is an eye condition involving inward deviation of the eye, usually due to extra-ocular muscle imbalance. It is a type of heterophoria.

Cause
Causes include:
 Refractive errors
 Divergence insufficiency
 Convergence excess; this can be due to nerve, muscle, congenital or mechanical anomalies.

Unlike esotropia, fusion is possible and therefore diplopia is uncommon.

References

External links 

Disorders of ocular muscles, binocular movement, accommodation and refraction